Gathering seafood by hand can be as easy as picking shellfish or kelp up off the beach, or doing some digging for clams or crabs, or perhaps diving under the water for abalone or lobsters.

Shellfish can be collected from intertidal areas using a spade or rake and put through a sieve to extract the ones of marketable size.

Seafood can be found in coastal zones as well as rivers and lakes around the world. Seafood suitable for gathering by hand includes aquatic invertebrates such as molluscs, crustaceans, and echinoderms, as well as aquatic plants. Some molluscs (shellfish) commonly gathered are oysters, clams, scallops, and cockles. Some crustaceans commonly gathered are lobster, crayfish, and crabs. A common plant gathered is kelp. Echinoderms are not gathered as much as mollusks and crustaceans. In Asia, sea cucumbers and sea urchins are gathered. In parts of the United States, mainly the South, catfish, primarily of the flathead species, are occasionally caught by hand in a technique most often known as noodling.

Very little or no specialized equipment is required to gather many of these sea foods.  Evidence for shellfish consumption in prehistory should be apparent, since the discarded shell can remain for long periods. In fact, the earliest evidence for shellfish consumption dates to a 300,000-year-old site in France called Terra Amata. This is a hominid site, as modern Homo sapiens did not appear until around 50,000 years ago. The importance of shellfish in prehistoric diet has been the source of much debate in archaeology. Sometimes they are referred to as a famine food and their nutritional value is played down at the expense of terrestrial or non-marine food sources.

Some shellfish are gathered by diving. Pearl diving is the practice of hunting for oysters by free-diving to depths to 30 m. Abalone are also gathered by diving. Divers can also catch lobsters by hand.

See also

 2004 Morecambe Bay cockling disaster
 Clam digging

References

Further reading

 Claassen, C. 1998. Shells. Cambridge University Press (Cambridge Manuals in Archaeology Series)
 Reaske, Christopher R (1986)Complete Clammer: Clams, Mussels, Oysters, Scallops - An Enthusiast's Guide to Gathering and Preparation. Lyons Books. 
 Schiffer (ed.) Advances in Archaeological Method and Theory 10. New York: Academic Press.
 Szabo, Katherine Prehistoric Shellfish gathering.
 Waselkov, G.A. 1987. Shellfish Gathering and Shell Midden Archaeology. In M.J.

External links

Fishing techniques and methods